Lila Garrett (November 21, 1925 – February 1, 2020) was an American television screenwriter and radio host who wrote for the sitcoms
The Second Hundred Years (co-wrote episodes 10 and 13 with Bernie Kahn),
My Favorite Martian, All in the Family,
and Bewitched. She co-wrote with Bernie Kahn and Stu Billett the 1971 Disney TV movie The Barefoot Executive.

An anti-war activist, Garrett's political engagement includes founding Americans Against War with Iraq, serving as a DNC delegate for presidential candidate  Michael Dukakis, presiding as President over the Southern California chapter of the Americans for Democratic Action and becoming a founding member of Progressive Democrats of America.

She hosted KPFK's Connect the Dots on Pacifica Radio, interviewing left-leaning luminaries and often closing her show with "The arms industry has neither allies nor enemies, only customers." Garrett was also a frequent contributor to the online magazine LA Progressive.

She had lived in the Motion Picture & Television Country House and Hospital.

Awards
 Shared Daytime Emmy Award for The ABC Afternoon Playbreak episode Mother of The Bride
 Shared Daytime Emmy Award for The ABC Afternoon Playbreak episode The Girl Who Couldn't Lose
 1984, shared Writers Guild of America Award for The Other Woman

References

External links
 

1925 births
2020 deaths
Screenwriters from New York (state)
Writers from Brooklyn